David Lawrence Sackett  (November 17, 1934 – May 13, 2015) was an American-Canadian  physician and a pioneer in evidence-based medicine. He is known as one of the fathers of Evidence-Based Medicine. He founded the first department of clinical epidemiology in Canada at McMaster University, and the Oxford Centre for Evidence-Based Medicine. He is well known for his textbooks Clinical Epidemiology and Evidence-Based Medicine.

One of his more famous quotes is: "Half of what you learn in medical school is dead wrong."

Education
Sackett obtained his medical degree at the University of Illinois, and a Master of Science in Epidemiology from Harvard University.

Career
David Sackett made seminal contributions to the science of health care and the teaching and practice of medicine. He did so through vision (about how to improve health care through research), innovation (in research methods for health care and education of researchers and clinicians), and engendering collegiality and collaboration.
Among his more important randomized clinical trials, and in collaboration with colleagues around the world, he was a Principal Investigator in the trials that showed, for the first time anywhere, the life-saving benefits of aspirin for patients with threatened stroke and threatened heart attack, that surgically repairing the "hardened" arteries of patients with threatened stroke (carotid endarterectomy) prevented both stroke and death, and the ability of nurse practitioners to provide effective, high-quality primary care.  In addition, his "debunking" trials showed the futility of traditional health education in helping hypertensive patients take their medicine, and that a popular "bypass" operation for stroke-prone individuals did more harm than good.

He repeated his residency in medicine some 20 years after first training because, although a professor in medical school, he 'wasn't a good enough doctor.'"

His contributions to research methodology included ways to detect and reduce bias in clinical research, and ways to design, conduct, and report randomized clinical trials.  
David Sackett is widely regarded as one of 3 "fathers" of modern clinical epidemiology (along with Archie Cochrane of the UK and Alvan Feinstein of the USA). Clinical epidemiology is a research discipline based on the methods of epidemiology (and other scientific pursuits, notably biostatistics, the behavioral sciences, and health economics), applied to understanding the nature of health care problems and, especially, their management. Thus, it is a bridging discipline, linking research to clinical practice. Typical topics include the cause, diagnosis, course (prognosis, clinical prediction), prevention, treatment, and amelioration of health disorders, and the improvement and cost-effectiveness of health services.

Sackett was the founding chair of the first department of Clinical Epidemiology and Biostatistics in the world at McMaster University in Hamilton, Ontario, in 1967, and extensively contributed to the development of research methods through his books and published articles, as well as through education and lectures at McMaster and around the world. Notably, he turned clinical research into a scientifically sound and practical, multidisciplinary "team sport" and has changed for the better the quality of health care research and clinical practice. 
 
In the late 1970s, Sackett began to popularize the use of clinical epidemiologic principles in the practice of medicine and other health care disciplines, working with his former students, Brian Haynes, Peter Tugwell, Gordon Guyatt and eventually many other clinician scientists at McMaster University and around the world. Initially termed "critical appraisal of the medical literature", to help practitioners keep up with scientific advances in health care, this became "evidence-based medicine". Evidence-Based Medicine: An Oral History documents some of the highlights of the role that he and others played in the evolution of EBM. Sackett led the writing of seminal articles on clinical disagreement and how to read clinical journals books, beginning in 1980 in the Canadian Medical Association Journal, followed by seminal books, beginning in 1985 with Clinical Epidemiology: A Basic Science for Clinical Medicine.

In 1994, Sackett accepted an invitation from (later, Sir) Muir Gray of the UK National Health Service to start the first Centre for Evidence-Based Medicine in Britain, as Professor of Clinical Epidemiology, Nuffield Department of Clinical Medicine, University of Oxford.
 
Clinically, Sackett practiced as a general internist and was appointed Physician-in-Chief of Medicine at the Chedoke-McMaster Hospital in Hamilton Ontario in 1986, then Head of the Division of General Internal Medicine in 1988. In Oxford, he practiced as Honorary NHS Consultant in General Medicine.

Retired from clinical practice in 1999, he returned to Canada and created the Trout Research & Education Centre, where he read, researched, wrote and taught about randomized clinical trials. He also authored, with Sharon Straus, the definitive guide about mentorship for clinician scientists. Along the way, he has published 10 books, chapters for about 50 others, and about 300 papers in medical and scientific journals. He died on May 13, 2015 in Markdale, Ontario.

Honours

David Sackett won many awards, honorary degrees and accolades for his research, teaching and writing. Notably, in 1992, he was made a Fellow of the Royal Society of Canada. In 2000, he was inducted into the Canadian Medical Hall of Fame.[5] In 2001, he was appointed Officer of the Order of Canada.[4] In 2009, he was awarded the Gairdner Foundation Wightman Award.[6] He was awarded honorary doctorates from the University of Bern, Switzerland, and McMaster University, Canada, and appointed as Honorary Professor of Clinical Epidemiology, at the West China University of Medical Sciences, and Adjunct Professor of the University of Ottawa, Canada.

Selected publications

 David L Sackett: Interview in 2014 and 2015. Haynes RB (editor). 2015. https://fhs.mcmaster.ca/ceb/docs/David_L_Sackett_Interview_in_2014_2015.pdf
 Sackett DL, Haynes RB (editors). Compliance with Therapeutic Regimens.  Baltimore: Johns Hopkins University Press, 1976.
 Haynes RB, Taylor DW, Sackett DL. Compliance in Health Care. Baltimore: Johns Hopkins University Press, 1979. .
 
 
 
 
 
 
 Sackett DL, Haynes RB, Tugwell P. Clinical epidemiology: a basic science for clinical medicine, First edition. Boston: Little, Brown, 1985. .
 
 
 
 
 
 
 
 
 Sackett DL, Straus SE, Richardson WS, Rosenberg W, Haynes RB. Evidence-based medicine: how to practice and teach EBM, 2nd ed. Edinburgh & New York: Churchill Livingstone, 2000. .
 Haynes RB, Sackett DL, Guyatt GH, Tugwell P. Clinical epidemiology: how to do clinical practice research, 3rd edition. Philadelphia: Lippincott, Williams and Wilkins, 2006. .
 Straus SE, Sackett DL, Mentorship in Academic Medicine. John Wiley & Sons, 2014. Print

See also
Gordon Guyatt

References

External links
Profile of Dr. Sackett on Canadian Medical Hall of Fame - cdnmedhall.org
Profiling the EBM man - Professor Sackett - Student BMJ
The father of evidence-based medicine André Picard, The Globe and Mail (May 26, 2015)

Evidence-Based Medicine: An Oral History http://ebm.jamanetwork.com/index.html

1934 births
2015 deaths
American emigrants to Canada
Canadian epidemiologists
Canadian medical researchers
Fellows of the Royal Society of Canada
Harvard School of Public Health alumni
Academic staff of McMaster University
Officers of the Order of Canada
People in evidence-based medicine